George Malima Lubeleje (born February 12, 1950) is a Tanzanian politician and a member of the Chama Cha Mapinduzi political party. He was elected MP representing Mpwapwa in 2015.

References 

1950 births
Living people
Chama Cha Mapinduzi politicians
Tanzanian MPs 2015–2020